HMS Petersham was a  of the Royal Navy.

Their names of the class were all chosen from villages ending in -ham. The minesweeper was named after Petersham in Surrey.

Petersham was one of fifteen Ham Class minesweepers commissioned for the French Navy.

Unimaginatively re-christened with its hull number; M782 it was not until 22 February 1964 that the vessel was renamed Capucine, (Nasturtium), following the floral naming theme of the group.

Based at Cherbourg, she saw active service on national and multi-national operations. In 1960 she was moved to Paris and in the late '60's was mothballed back at Cherbourg. In the 1970s she was brought out of reserve, re-purposed as a training vessel and, in 1973, re-classified as an auxiliary vessel.

Capucine was taken out of service in April 1984, the Ham class training ships being replaced by eight new Leopard class vessels. In September 1984 she was relocated to the naval cemetery at Landévennec with her siblings. In 1985 she was sold for scrap and dismantled at Brest.

References

Ham-class minesweepers
Ships built on the River Clyde
1955 ships
Cold War minesweepers of the United Kingdom
Royal Navy ship names
Ham-class minesweepers of the French Navy